Slate pencil urchin is a common name for several sea urchin species with blunt spines:

 Eucidaris, a genus with several tropical species, especially:
 Eucidaris thouarsii, an East Pacific species
 Eucidaris tribuloides, an Atlantic species
 Heterocentrotus, a genus with two Indo-Pacific species

Animal common name disambiguation pages